Ilyâs ibn Sâlih was the leader of the Berghouata in modern-day Morocco from 792 to 842. He is said to have professed Islam publicly but Salih's religion secretly, and died in the 50th year of his reign.

9th-century Moroccan people